Patrice Brasey (born January 28, 1964 in Fribourg, Switzerland) is a former Swiss ice hockey player. He played in the National League A for HC Fribourg-Gottéron, HC Lugano, ZSC Lions and Genève-Servette HC. He also played for the Switzerland men's national ice hockey team at the 1988 and 1992 Olympics, as well as the 1987 World Ice Hockey Championships.

External links

1964 births
Living people
Genève-Servette HC players
HC Fribourg-Gottéron players
HC Lugano players
Ice hockey players at the 1988 Winter Olympics
Ice hockey players at the 1992 Winter Olympics
Neuchâtel Young Sprinters HC players
Olympic ice hockey players of Switzerland
People from Fribourg
Swiss ice hockey defencemen
ZSC Lions players
Sportspeople from the canton of Fribourg